The 2013–14 South Florida Bulls men's basketball team represented the University of South Florida Bulls during the 2013–14 NCAA Division I men's basketball season.  This was the 43rd season of Basketball for USF, and the first as a member of the American Athletic Conference. The Bulls were coached by Stan Heath, who was in his seventh season.  The Bulls played home games at the USF Sun Dome. They finished the season 12–20, 3–15 in AAC play to finish in last place. They lost in the first round of the AAC tournament to Rutgers.

At the end of the season, head coach Stan Heath was fired after posting a record of 97–128 in six seasons. He was replaced by former Kentucky assistant Orlando Antigua.

Off season
As of July 1, 2013, USF became a member of the American Athletic Conference, the result of a split in the old Big East.

USF was selected to participate in the 2013 Continental Tire Las Vegas Classic, which takes place December 22–23 at Orleans Arena.

At American Athletic Conference Media day, USF was selected by the coaches to finish 8th out of 10. Senior forward, Victor Rudd, and junior point guard, Anthony Collins, were both selected at media day to the American Athletic Conference Preseason All-Conference Second Team.

Departures

Incoming recruits

Season highlights
Freshman, Chris Perry received honors early in the season, being named the American Athletic Conference Rookie of the Week in the first week for his effort against Tennessee Tech. Perry scored 14 points, recorded 7 rebounds, 2 blocks, and 2 steals. The following week, Corey Allen Jr. was named to the American Athletic Conference Weekly Honor Roll for his effort against Bethune-Cookman and Bowling Green in which he averaged 20 points, 7 rebounds, and 6 assists.

Roster

Schedule and results

|-
!colspan=9 style="background:#006747; color:#CFC493;"| Exhibition

|-
!colspan=9 style="background:#006747; color:#CFC493;"| Regular season

|-
!colspan=9 style="background:#006747; color:#CFC493;"| American Athletic Conference tournament

|-

Notes
 March 31, 2014 – Former Kentucky assistant coach Orlando Antigua was hired to replace Stan Heath

References

South Florida Bulls men's basketball seasons
South Florida Bulls